Jindřich Zdík (also anglicized as Henry Zdík) (c. 1083 – 1150 in Prague) was bishop of Olomouc from 1126 to 1150.

Biography
Zdík went on a pilgrimage to the Holy Land in 1137/1138. While he was there, Rorgo Fretellus of Nazareth dedicated to him his Description of the Holy Places.

A deed of Jindřich Zdík from 1141 (originally erroneously dated to 1131), in which he transfers his seat to the newly built Saint Wenceslas Cathedral and lists the estates of the Roman Catholic Church in Moravia, is an important and valuable historical document, which is for many Moravian villages and towns the first written mention of the settlement.

In 1141, with papal authorization, Zdík undertook a mission against the Prussians, leading directly to his involvement with the Wendish Crusade of 1147.

After returning from his pilgrimage he had the idea of founding a monastery of regular canons in Prague, which would materialize as Strahov Monastery. Zdík had the support of the bishops of Prague, the Duke of Bohemia Soběslav I, and — after his death — Vladislav II. After Zdík's first unsuccessful attempt to found a Czech variant of the canons' order at the place called Strahov in 1140, an invitation was issued to the Premonstratensians, whose first representatives arrived from Steinfeld in the Rhine valley (Germany).

Hildebert and Everwin, two medieval manuscript illuminators, worked in the scriptorium under Bishop Zdík.

References

External links
List of towns and villages in the Jindřich Zdík's deed at website of the municipality of Bělov

1080s births
1150 deaths
Bishops of Olomouc